Incheon Nonhyeon Station is a railroad station in Namdong-gu, Incheon. It opened on 30 June 2012.

It was called "Nonhyeon Curtilage (Korean Hangul: , Hanja: , RR: Nonhyeontaekji, MR: Nonhyŏnt'aekchi) Station" tentatively, but Korail decided its official name "Incheon Nonhyeon Station" and announced it on 15 May 2012.

References

Metro stations in Incheon
Railway stations opened in 2012
Seoul Metropolitan Subway stations
Namdong District